Agapit Pierre Jean Joseph Stevens (1848–1917) was a Belgian painter of figures and genre scenes, including several Orientalist pictures of odalisques, dancers and harem musicians.

Life 
Agapit Stevens was apparently born under the name Agapit Pierre Jean Joseph Van Gotsenhoven in Brussels on 21 October 1848. His brother was the painter René Stevens.

He was a member of the L'Essor artists' association, but there is no record of his artistic training. At some point he changed his name to Agapit Pierre Jean Joseph Stevens, and that name appears on his death certificate.

He died in Watermael-Boitsfort, Brussels in 1917 or 1924.

Pseudonym 
Agapit Stevens was the collective name of a group of painters and pastellists, many of whom had been followers of Alfred Stevens. They specialised in genre scenes and portraits of elegant ladies stylishly dressed in satin, silk and velvet in the fashions of the Second French Empire.

Notes

References 

 Beyer, Andreas; Savoy, Bénédicte; and Tegethoff, Wolf, eds. (2021) "Stevens, Agapit". In Allgemeines Künstlerlexikon. Berlin, New York: K. G. Saur. De Gruyter.
 Oliver, Valerie Cassel, ed. (2011). "Stevens, Agapit". In Benezit Dictionary of Artists. Oxford University Press. Oxford Art Online.
 Piron, Paul L. (1999). De Belgische beeldende kunstenaars uit de 19de en 20ste eeuw, Vol. 2: L–Z. Brussels: Art in Belgium.
 Piron, Paul L. (2003). Dictionnaire des artistes plasticiens de Belgique des xixe et xxe siècles, Vol. 2: L–Z. Ohain (Lasne): Art in Belgium. p. 470.
 "Agapit Stevens". RKD-Nederlands Instituut voor Kunstgeschiedenis. 29 July 2020. Retrieved 26 April 2022.

External links 

 Hervé, Lauret (1997–2014). "Peintres orientalistes belges". Les Peintres Orientalistes. Retrieved 26 April 2022.

1848 births
1917 deaths
19th-century Belgian painters
19th-century Belgian male artists
20th-century Belgian painters
20th-century Belgian male artists